The Toronto Zen Centre (or, Toronto Zen Center), is a Sanbo Kyodan Zen Buddhist practice center in Toronto, Ontario, Canada. It is modeled after the Rochester Zen Center.
They offer introductory workshops in Zen Buddhism. The Toronto Zen Centre offers a couple of unique Buddhist course in Loving Kindness Meditation and periodically offers Mastering Breath Awareness or an MBA.

Foundation
Founded initially by Philip Kapleau in 1972 as the Toronto Buddhist Centre, the center went on to eventually be incorporated as the Toronto Zen Centre in 1986. Currently the abbot of the Vermont Zen Center - Sensei Sunyana Graef  (Dharma heir of Philip Kapleau) is directing the centre's spiritual path while Sensei Taigen Henderson is the Abbot or Roshi of the centre.

See also
Buddhism in Canada
Timeline of Zen Buddhism in the United States
Zen Center

Notes

References

External links
Official website

Zen centers
Buddhist temples in Ontario
Religious buildings and structures in Toronto